A bachelor party is a party held for a man who is about to be married (for woman, see bachelorette party).

Bachelor party may also refer to:
The Bachelor Party, a 1957 film
Bachelor Party (1984 film), an American comedy film
Bachelor Party 2: The Last Temptation, a 2008 American comedy film, sequel to the 1984 film
Bachelor Party (2012 film), an Indian Malayalam-language film
"Bachelor Party" (Angel), an episode of the TV series Angel
"Bachelor Party" (How I Met Your Mother), an episode of the TV series How I Met Your Mother
Bachelor Party (video game), a 1983 adult-themed video game for the Atari 2600